San Miguel is a census-designated place in Contra Costa County, California. The 2010 United States census reported San Miguel's population was 3,392.

Geography

Demographics
At the 2010 census San Miguel had a population of 3,392. The racial makeup of San Miguel was 2,986 (88.0%) White, 31 (0.9%) African American, 3 (0.1%) Native American, 190 (5.6%) Asian, 3 (0.1%) Pacific Islander, 38 (1.1%) from other races, and 141 (4.2%) from two or more races. Hispanic or Latino of any race were 200 people (5.9%).

The census reported that 99.8% of the population lived in households and 0.2% lived in non-institutionalized group quarters.

There were 1,253 households, 454 (36.2%) had children under the age of 18 living in them, 855 (68.2%) were opposite-sex married couples living together, 86 (6.9%) had a female householder with no husband present, 47 (3.8%) had a male householder with no wife present.  There were 39 (3.1%) unmarried opposite-sex partnerships, and 12 (1.0%) same-sex married couples or partnerships. 198 households (15.8%) were one person and 105 (8.4%) had someone living alone who was 65 or older. The average household size was 2.70.  There were 988 families (78.9% of households); the average family size was 3.02.

The age distribution was 830 people (24.5%) under the age of 18, 168 people (5.0%) aged 18 to 24, 572 people (16.9%) aged 25 to 44, 1,280 people (37.7%) aged 45 to 64, and 542 people (16.0%) who were 65 or older.  The median age was 47.2 years. For every 100 females, there were 96.0 males.  For every 100 females age 18 and over, there were 94.4 males.

There were 1,291 housing units at an average density of ,of which 1,253 were occupied, 1,143 (91.2%) by the owners and 110 (8.8%) by renters.  The homeowner vacancy rate was 1.0%; the rental vacancy rate was 6.0%.  3,098 people (91.3% of the population) lived in owner-occupied housing units and 286 people (8.4%) lived in rental housing units.

Education
San Miguel is in the Walnut Creek Elementary School District and the Acalanes Union High School District.

References

Census-designated places in Contra Costa County, California
Census-designated places in California